Ved Senior Secondary School, Hisar is a private school located in Gali no 4, Jawahar Nagar, Hisar in the Indian state of Haryana.

Academics
The schools offer classes till 10+2.

See also 
 List of Universities and Colleges in Hisar
 List of schools in Hisar
 List of institutions of higher education in Haryana

Schools in Hisar (city)
Private schools in Haryana